Living Proof is the first live album by the British neo-progressive rock band IQ. It was released in 1986 and published by Samurai Records. IQ was not aware of the release, and the sound quality of the LP was low. In 1992 IQ reissued the album with better sound quality by the label Giant Electric Pea.

Track listing

References

IQ (band) albums
1986 live albums